The Smile Wins is a 1928 American short silent comedy film directed by Robert F. McGowan. This was the 72nd Our Gang short subject released, and the last Our Gang short that Hal Roach released through Pathé Exchange.

Cast

The Gang
 Allen Hoskins as Farina
 Jannie Hoskins as Mango
 Joe Cobb as Joe
 Jackie Condon as Jackie
 Jay R. Smith as Jay
 Harry Spear as Harry
 Pete the Pup as himself

Additional cast
 Johnny Aber as Kid throwing tomato
 Mildred Kornman as Toddler on the gang's merry-go-round
 George B. French as Simon Sleazy
 Florence Hoskins as Farina's mother
 Jean Darling as Undetermined role
 Bobby Hutchins as Undetermined role
 Budd Fine as Undetermined role
 Lyle Tayo as Undetermined role

See also
 Our Gang filmography

References

External links

The Smile Wins at SilentEra

1928 films
American silent short films
American black-and-white films
1928 comedy films
1928 short films
Films directed by Robert F. McGowan
Hal Roach Studios short films
Our Gang films
1920s American films
Silent American comedy films
1920s English-language films